Dibyo Previan Caesario (4 June 1992 – 30 May 2017) was an Indonesian footballer. He played as a striker for Persita Tangerang in the Indonesia Super League.

Club career
He scored his first goal in a 2–1 loss against Persib Bandung on 31 August 2014.

References

External links
 Profile at ligaindonesia.co.id 
 Profile at goal.com
 

1992 births
2017 deaths
Indonesian footballers
Association football forwards
Persita Tangerang players